Arjun – Prince of Bali is an Indian animated television series produced by Green Gold Animation. It premiered on 1 June 2014 on Disney Channel India. It is a spin-off of the show Chhota Bheem. The main character of the show, Arjun, was first featured in the film Chhota Bheem and the Throne of Bali. The show features the adventures of Arjun, the prince of Bali.

Lore 
1675 – 1712 Season 1: Arjun wakes up on his birthday (March 27) he is served food by the royal cook's, Arjun's father, Sahadev Verma comes in and tells him that he is gonna need to train more since now he is the Prince of Bali, Arjun agrees and he trains while a villain and an enemy awaits to ruin the peace, she kidnaps the king, Sahadev Verma to rule bali but Arjun sneaks put of the kingdom and beats Tantara and rescues his father, after few days an arena takes place, among the 5 nations come different and powerful warriors, Arjuns father gets him ready by training him with his physical strength and after few days of training he at last gets very strong and the arena starts, the arena was called "TOUGH ARENA" by the title you can guess that you will need to be very very very strong to win, the Commander in Chief of the bali army named "Bairo" chose people from the warrior's team, Arjun went first and he beat all 4 warriors and at the last one, an arrow came and destroyed the aiming board, it turns out it is none other than Arjun's older brother, Sankat! he went out for 3 years to train with Sahadev's brother and he said that he wanted to be Arjun's opponent and both got ready to wrestle, Sankat was overpowering Arjun but suddenly the ground started to shake and a huge monster came out, his name was Madaraka, he took over Bali under 6 hours and Arjun and the gang went to guru bahula the spiritual teacher of the kingdom, Arjun told him about the situation and Bahula understood the task and told him there was an arrow guarded by 5 archangels, if you wanna take the arrow you have to beat them and take the arrow and kill Madaraka with it, Arjun beats the archangels and kills Madaraka, and celebrate Diwali !, now there are many villains in the Arjun series, some are even Arjun's friends!, now there used to be a clown, well he used to praise the previous king of bali, or Arjun's grandfather he did bad things to Kid Bairo! such as abuse his magical powers and make engines come out of kid Nimboo's mouth, prank Kid Bairo and splash him with water, Bairo's father fired him from being the entertainment guy, and his plan was working he tried assassinating the king, turns out he was a spy from another kingdom! Kid Sahadev and Kid Bairo both beat him up and imprisoned him, but he came back, it was a normal day Arjun woke up and registered to join a kite competition, they all trained while Nimboo made Arjun's kite, his kite was a 2000 year old legendary super kite, Sankat pranked Arjun by putting oil on the string which made the kite go out of control while Arjun was training and the kite flew all the way to the guests of Sahadev destroying the food, Arjun says "I am sorry" Sahaev says i didn't expect this from you, and he becomes disappointed to himself and said that he is not gonna participate, the next day the competition starts and Arjun comes in fancy clothes just to watch and then all the kites start going out of control, he sees a man on a kite, it turns out that the man from Sahadev's fathers time broke out of prison after 25 years ! he said that he will take revenge on the kingdom, Arjun gets his kite and Bahula casts the spell on it which releases the 2000 year old seal and he flies and defeats him (i talked about only the important things to the lore not the none important ones) Season 2:

Characters

Main
Arjun:  A 11-year old prince of Bali. He is raised to be skilled in warfare and archery. Arjun derives 10x power from his favourite Badam milk and is ever ready to save the day. He is helpful, champion of the good who loves being in the limelight. He has a very cute relationship with his sister Tanya and mostly takes care of her and protects her. Sometimes because of some unacceptable situations her sister fights with him but, Arjun knows how to control her very well.
Zimbu: Zimbu is Arjun's 6-month-old loyal pet tiger. He always accompanies Arjun in fights and duels.
King Sahadev Verma: King Sahadev Verma is the 36-year-old king of Bali. He is the father of Arjun and Tanya.
Queen Suvarna: She is the 30-year old beautiful, charming and poised queen of Bali. She is a mother who adores her son and daughter.
Tanya: The 9-year old Princess of Bali and sister of Arjun, she is sweet, charming and graceful. Sassy and spunky, she adores her brother, but finds him condescending at times and that's why she sometimes gets into a fight with him! But she also admires and praises Arjun and always takes his side. Just like her brother Arjun, she is also skilled in dance and gymnastics. She is the best dancer in the whole region and no one can be compared with her in dancing. She also has two twin playmates with her named Aci and Ayu. She has a very beautiful relation as a little sister with Arjun.

Recurring
Pucho: He is a loyal friend of Arjun and he says that he is the bodyguard of Arjun.
Khojo: He is the son of a minister in the King's court and always thinks of plans so that he can defeat Arjun. He also has a small crush on Tanya and is always wanting to impress her. 
Khamba: He is a loyal friend of Khojo and carries him on his back.
Bahula: He is the loyal spiritual advisor and guru to the king and Arjun. Spiritually enlightened, his penance has great power and he is worldly wise, especially when dealing with crisis.
Senapati Bhairoo: He is the Senapati of Bali and guru of Arjun and father of Pucho.
Wangi: She is a loyal friend of Arjun and lives in the jungle. 
Nimboo: He is a royal chef in the Kings' palace and everyone loves the food he makes.
Sankat: He is a 12-year-old boy that is trained in Warfare, Archery, and how to use Mace (Gadā), Sword, he is the rival of Arjun and he is one of the first shown characters in Season 1 Episode 2. He is also strong as Arjun and sometimes he has been shown stronger than him.

References 

Chhota Bheem
2014 Indian television series debuts
Indian children's animated action television series
Indian children's animated adventure television series
Indian children's animated comedy television series
Indian television spin-offs
Indian television shows based on films
Disney Channel (Indian TV channel) original programming
Animated television series about children
Television shows set in Indonesia
Television series about tigers